The Moel Hiraddug Limestone is a geologic formation in Wales. It preserves fossils dating back to the Carboniferous period.

See also

 List of fossiliferous stratigraphic units in Wales

References
 

Carboniferous System of Europe
Carboniferous Wales
Limestone formations
Carboniferous southern paleotropical deposits